The Battle of Xingyang may refer to:

Battle of Xingyang (205 BC), a battle fought between Xiang Yu and Liu Bang in the Chu-Han contention period
Battle of Xingyang (190), a battle fought between the Guandong Coalition and Dong Zhuo during the Han Dynasty